Prague Ham is a type of brine-cured, stewed, and mildly beechwood-smoked boneless ham originally from Prague in Bohemia (Czech Republic). When cooked on the bone, it is called šunka od kosti ("ham from the bone"), considered a delicacy. It was first marketed in the 1860s by Antonín Chmel, a pork butcher from Prague's Zvonařka ("Bell-Maker street") on the Nuselské schody (The Nusle Steps).

It was a popular export during the 1920s and 1930s – to the point that other cultures started copying the recipe and making it domestically. Pražská šunka/Prague Ham is registered as a Traditional Speciality Guaranteed in the European Union and the UK and can only be produced according to a specified procedure.

Prague Ham as street food
Prague Ham is traditionally served in restaurants and from street vendors with a side of boiled potatoes and often accompanied by Czech beer.

Most street vendors sell it by weight in grams rather than per serving.

Names in other languages
The following translations are registered for the Traditional Speciality Guaranteed:
Bulgarian: Пражка шунка.
Czech and Slovakian: Pražská šunka.
Danish: Prag Skinke.
Dutch: Praagse Ham.
Estonian: Praha sink.
Finnish: Prahalainen kinkku.
German: Prager Schinken.
Greek: Χοιρομέρι Πράγας.
Hungarian: Prágai minőségi sonka.
Italian: Prosciutto di Praga. 
Latvian: Prāgas šķiņķis.
Maltese: Perżut ta' Praga.
Norwegian: Pragerskinke.
Polish: Szynka Praska.
Portuguese: Fiambre de Praga.
Romanian: Suncă de Praga.
Serbo-Croatian and Slovene: Praška šunka.
Serbian: Прашка шунка
Spanish: Jamón de Praga.
Swedish: Pragskinka.

See also
 Czech cuisine
 List of hams

References

Ham
Smoked meat
Czech cuisine
Traditional Speciality Guaranteed products from Czechia